James David Caldwell Sr., known as Buddy Caldwell (born May 20, 1946), is an American attorney and politician from the state of Louisiana. He served as Attorney General of Louisiana.

Caldwell lost his 2015 reelection bid to Jeff Landry. In 2018, the interim mayor of Tallulah, Louisiana, appointed Caldwell as interim city attorney.

See also
 List of American politicians who switched parties in office

References

1946 births
American male singers
American people of Russian-Jewish descent
District attorneys in Louisiana
Jewish American people in Louisiana politics
Living people
Louisiana Attorneys General
Louisiana Democrats
Louisiana Republicans
Singers from Louisiana
People from Columbia, Louisiana
People from Tallulah, Louisiana
Songwriters from Louisiana
Tulane Green Wave football players
Tulane University Law School alumni
Guitarists from Louisiana
American male guitarists
20th-century American guitarists
20th-century American male musicians
21st-century American Jews
American male songwriters